

General classification

Final general classification

References
Résultats sur siteducyclisme.net
Résultats sur cyclebase.nl

External links

Tour of Flanders
1922 in road cycling
1922 in Belgian sport
March 1922 sports events